Clathrodrillia dautzenbergi is a species of sea snail, a marine gastropod mollusk in the family Drilliidae.

Description
The size of an adult shell varies between 20 mm and 28 mm.

Distribution
This species occurs off the Mid-Atlantic Ridge, in the Caribbean Sea, in the Atlantic Ocean off Eastern Brazil.

References

 Donn L.Tippett, Taxonomic notes on the western Atlantic Turridae (Gastropoda: Conoidea); The Nautilus. v. 109 (1995–1996) 
 Fallon P.J. (2016). Taxonomic review of tropical western Atlantic shallow water Drilliidae (Mollusca: Gastropoda: Conoidea) including descriptions of 100 new species. Zootaxa. 4090(1): 1–363

External links
 

dautzenbergi
Gastropods described in 1995